Dudhauli is a municipality of the Sindhuli District in the Janakpur Zone of south-eastern Nepal.

Organization 
It was a village development committee but later changed to a Municipality. It merged Dudhauli VDC, Ladavir VDC, and Tandi VDC and later Sirthouli, Hatpate, Harsai, Nipane, Arunthakur, Kakurthakur and Jinakhu VDCs.

Dudhauli Bazar, Sankhatar, Dadatol, Khiriyani, Kartha, Bataha, Arunthakur, Kakurthakur, Hatpate, Nipane, Harsai, Dakaha, Sirthauli, Maini, Tandi etc. are the main villages of Dudhauli.

Infrastructure
 Central police training center Kogati
 Maini Mela
 Major parts of Alternative Highway
 Dudhauli Bazar
 Ladavir school
 Kamala multiple campus
 Kamala H.S. School, Maini

Demographics 
At the time of the 2011 Nepal census it had a population of 65,302 living in more than 4,000 households. It has in total 14 wards.

The people are mainly from Brahmin, Chhetri, Dalit, Magar, Lama, Tamang, Danuwar and other communities.

Economy 
It has substantial resources such as productive soil, calcium (a raw material for cement), water and forests. After the formation of the municipality, the development of physical infrastructure and social development activities is increasing.

Problems Here 
- Higher level of illiteracy, it means Lack of proper and quality of education to people. No Good higher education, no technical education facilities, Highest level of school dropouts by the lower level families' children due to their family problems and illiteracy.
- No good Roads are here, access and connectivity to big cities are much poorer. Due to many rivers here much Bridges are needed.
- No Hospital with Health facilities, too poor status.
- Poor condition of farmers, Lack of irrigation to lands, No cashcrops production.
- Unemployment 
- No factories, Businesses, and Entrepreneurship development . 
- Low development of infrastructures. 
- lower level of economic and social development of People inside here .

References

External links
UN map of the municipalities of Sindhuli District
Sindhuli District full Information

Populated places in Sindhuli District